{{Infobox horse race
| name            = 57th Prix de l'Arc de Triomphe
| horse race      = Prix de l'Arc de Triomphe
| image           = 
| caption         = 
| location        = Longchamp, Paris, France
| date            = 
| distance        = 
| winning horse   = Alleged (IRE)
| winning time    = 2:36.1
| final odds      = 14/10 favourite
| winning jockey  = Lester Piggott
| winning trainer = Vincent O'Brien
| winning owner   = Robert Sangster
| surface         = 
| attendance      = 
| conditions      = 
| previous        = 1977
| next            = 1979
}}
The 1978 Prix de l'Arc de Triomphe was a horse race held at Longchamp on Sunday 1 October 1978. It was the 57th running of the Prix de l'Arc de Triomphe.

The winner was Alleged, a four-year-old colt trained in Ireland by Vincent O'Brien and ridden by Lester Piggott. Alleged, the 14/10 favourite, defeated the mare Trillion by two lengths, with Dancing Maid a further two lengths back in third. Alleged became the sixth horse to win the race twice after Ksar, Motrico, Corrida, Tantieme and Ribot. The winning time was 2:36.1.

Race details
 Sponsor: none
 Purse: 
 Going: Dead
 Distance: 2,400 metres
 Number of runners: 18
 Winner's time: 2:36.1

Full result

* Abbreviations: ns = nose; shd = short-head; hd = head; snk = short neck; nk = neck

Winner's details
Further details of the winner, Alleged.
 Sex: Colt
 Foaled: 4 May 1974
 Country: United States
 Sire: Hoist The Flag; Dam: Princess Pout (Prince John)
 Owner: Robert Sangster
 Breeder:''' June McKnight

References

Prix de l'Arc de Triomphe
 1978
Prix de l'Arc de Triomphe
Prix de l'Arc de Triomphe
Prix de l'Arc de Triomphe